Transgressive may mean:

Transgressive art, a name given to art forms that violate perceived boundaries
Transgressive fiction, a modern style in literature
Transgressive Records, a United Kingdom-based independent record label
Transgressive (linguistics), a form of verb in some languages
Transgressive phenotype, a phenotype that is more extreme than the phenotypes displayed by either of the parents
Transgressive segregation
Cinema of Transgression, film movement using shock value and humor

See also
Transgression (disambiguation)